Roman comedy is mainly represented by two playwrights, Plautus (writing between c.205 and 184 BC) and Terence (writing c.166-160 BC). The works of other Latin playwrights such as Livius Andronicus, Naevius, Ennius, and Caecilius Statius are now lost except for a few lines quoted in other authors. 20 plays of Plautus survive complete, and 6 of Terence.

Various metres are used in the plays.

In Plautus about 37% of lines are unaccompanied iambic senarii, but in Terence more than half of the verses are senarii. Plautus's plays therefore had a greater amount of musical accompaniment than Terence's. Another difference between the playwrights was that polymetric songs (using metres other than iambic and trochaic) are frequent in Plautus (about 14% of the plays), but hardly used at all by Terence.

The different metres lend themselves to different moods: calm, energetic, comic, mocking, high-flown, grandiose, humorous, and so on. Certain metres are also associated with different kinds of characters; for example, old men frequently use iambic senarii, while the iambic septenarii are often used in scenes when a courtesan is on the stage.

The metres of Roman comedy tend to be more irregular than those of the classical period, but there is an opportunity to hear in them the rhythms of normal Latin speech. Cicero wrote of the senarius: "But the senarii of comic poets, because of their similarity to ordinary speech, are often so degraded that sometimes it's almost impossible to discern metre and verse in them."

The commonest metres
A publicly available database by Timothy J. Moore at the Washington University in St. Louis (see External links below) identifies the metre of every line of the two poets (based on the work of Cesare Questa and Wallace Lindsay) and gives detailed statistics for the use of the various metres. From this database it is apparent that by far the commonest metres, accounting for 79% of the lines in the two playwrights, are the following two:
Iambic senarius (ia6): 11,170 lines
| x – x – | x, – x – | x – u – |
Trochaic septenarius (tr7): 10,019 lines
| – x – x | – x – x || – x – x | – u – |

The schemata in this section are the basic patterns, and do not take into account the variations which may occur, for example the substitution of two short syllables for a long one. These are explained in greater detail below.

The following iambic and trochaic metres are also found but are less common:
Iambic septenarius (ia7): 1,718 lines
| x – x – | x – u – || x – x – | x – – | 
Iambic octonarius (ia8): 1,267 lines
| x – x – | x – u – || x – x – | x – u – | (type A)
| x – x – | x – x – | x, – x – | x – u – | (type B)
Trochaic octonarius (tr8): 211 lines
| – x – x | – x – x || – x – x | – x – – |

The following metres are used for songs, and are found mainly in Plautus:
Bacchiac quaternarius (ba4): 375 lines
| x – – | x – – || x – – | x – – |
Cretic quaternarius (cr4): 259 lines
| – x – | – u – || – x – | – u – |

The following anapaestic metres are found only in Plautus but not in Terence:
Anapaestic septenarius (an7): 216 lines
| uu – uu – | uu – uu – || uu – uu – | uu – – |
Anapaestic octonarius (an8): 212 lines
| uu – uu – | uu – uu – || uu – uu – | uu – uu – |
Anapaestic quaternarius (an4): (at least) 135 lines
| uu – uu – | uu – uu – |

Together, the ten metres listed above account for all but about 1% of the 27,228 lines of the two poets.

Differences between Plautus and Terence

The metres are used in different proportions by the two playwrights. In Plautus, 47% of the lines are iambic, 43% trochaic, and 10% in other metres (mostly anapaestic, bacchiac, and cretic). In Terence, 75% of the lines are iambic, 24% trochaic, and only 1% in other metres (bacchiac and cretic).

In Plautus, 37% of the lines are unaccompanied iambic senarii, but in Terence 56%. More than 4% of Plautus's lines are anapaestic, but this metre is not used at all in Terence. The trochaic septenarius is much more frequent in Plautus (41%) than in Terence (22%). The trochaic octonarius is slightly more frequent in Terence (1.5%) than in Plautus (0.6%). On the other hand, Terence makes much more use of the iambic octonarius metre than Plautus.

In Plautus a change of metre often accompanies the exit or entrance of a character, and thus frames a scene. At other times it indicates a change of pace, such as when Amphitruo's slave Sosia changes from iambic octonarii to a cretic metre when he begins to describe a battle.

In Terence different metres accompany different characters: for example, in each of Terence's plays, the woman loved by a young man uses iambic septenarii; in the Heauton Timorumenos, Eunuchus, and Phormio, one of the two young men is associated with trochaics, the other with iambics. Thus there can be frequent changes of metre within a single scene.

About 15% of Plautus's plays on average consists of polymetric cantica (songs in a mixture of metres). In these, the most common metres are the bacchius (x – – ) and cretic (– x –), together with anapaests (u u –), but sometimes with other metres mixed in. One play (Miles) has no polymetric cantica, but Casina has four. Because of metrical ambiguities, the analysis of the metres of cantica can be disputed.

The ABC metrical pattern
It has been noted that in both playwrights, but especially in Plautus, the use of different metres tends to form a pattern, which Moore refers to as the "ABC succession". Often a play can be divided into sections, which follow the pattern: A = iambic senarii, B = other metres, C = trochaic septenarii. In Plautus's Menaechmi, for example, the first four sections follow the ABC scheme, and only the 5th is different; thus the whole scheme is ABC, ABC, ABC, ABC, ACBCBC. In his Pseudolus, in the same way, the ABC pattern is used four times, followed by a final scene of 91 lines in other metres, making ABC, ABC, ABC, ABC, B. However, not all plays follow this scheme. For example, in Terence's Adelphoe, the pattern is ABCBAB, ABC, BCACB, AC, ABABC. In general it appears that Terence changes mode more frequently than Plautus. Four of Plautus's plays (Cistellaria, Stichus, Epidicus, and Persa) open directly with music, omitting the customary expository speech in unaccompanied iambic senarii.

The B-sections of the plays tend to be songs in which the characters express their mood or character, or sing of love. The C-sections (in trochaic septenarii) tend to be associated with advancement of the plot. "The beginning of the first long series of trochaic septenarii usually marks a moment at which, after exposition and presentation of character, the plot begins to proceed in earnest." (Moore) When a playwright moves directly from A to C, it often marks urgency or an especially significant moment in the plot.

Verse ictus and word accent

Ictus
In his , Horace described the senarius as having "six beats". However, there is some controversy among scholars over what this means and to what extent word accent played a role in Plautus and Terence's verse.

On one side, supporting the idea of an ictus or beat, are scholars such as W. Sidney Allen, Lionel Pearson, and from an earlier generation E.H. Sturtevant and Wallace Lindsay. Sturtevant writes: "It is scarcely possible any longer to doubt that accent was an important feature of early dramatic verse; the quantitative nature of the measures was carefully preserved, but at the same time accent was constantly taken into account."

However, many scholars, such as Paul Maas, Cesare Questa, and Wolfgang de Melo argue that there was no beat or "ictus"; in their view, rhythm is "simply the regulated sequence of short and long syllables". Similarly, Benjamin Fortson writes: "The theory that there was a verse-ictus, never universally accepted, has by now been thoroughly discredited." Gratwick, in his edition of the Menaechmi, takes an intermediate position, rejecting "both the Anglo-German view that the lines are isochronous with a regular metrical beat attached to every longum, and the Franco-Italian view that there is no ictus at all in such verses".

One fact which is generally agreed on is that in iambic and trochaic metres, there is usually a fairly strong agreement between where the ictus is assumed to be and the accent of the words. Thus in iambics a word-accent is generally heard on the 2nd, 4th, 6th and 8th elements of the line:

| – – – – | – – – – | – – u – |
"In case anyone is wondering who I am, let me explain briefly."

Whereas in trochaics, the accent is usually heard on the 1st, 3rd, 5th, and 7th elements:

| – – – – | – – – – || – u – uu | – u – |
"It's happening to me alive what no one will ever do to me when I am dead!"

Thus even though both lines begin with a series of long syllables, it is clear on reading them that the first is iambic and second trochaic.

The match between accent and ictus is not exact. For example, in the final metron of an iambic line, there is often a clash between ictus and accent. Gratwick's view is that so far from attempting to make the word accent match the ictus, Roman writers often deliberately tried to avoid such coincidence, especially at the beginning and end of the line, to avoid monotony.

The following table shows the percentage of anceps positions in the iambic senarius which are accented. It is based on a survey by J. J. Schlicher of the 533 iambic senarius lines in Plautus's . Overall only 20% of anceps positions are accented. The 2nd, 3rd and 4th are rarely accented, but in the 5th and 6th there is quite often a clash of accent and metrical ictus:

There is disagreement, however, about whether this avoidance of accent in the 2nd, 3rd, and 4th anceps was deliberately aimed for by the poets, or whether it just happened automatically as a result of placing a caesura after the 5th element.

Because it seems that the poets made an effort to place the accent mostly on the long elements, it is argued by Lindsay that occasionally it may be possible to detect from this how Latin was pronounced. For example, the phrase  or  occurs six times in Plautus with the syllable -ser in the long element, suggesting that it was accented on this syllable. Similarly it has been suggested that the phrase  "my darling", with shortened -lup, may have been pronounced with the accent on -tās. However, there is no agreement among scholars about this, especially French and Italian scholars, most of whom believe that the Latin accent was a musical one which had no effect on the metre.

Percussiōnēs
The rhetorician Quintilian wrote: "You can call it a trimeter or a senarius without any difference; since it has six feet, but three beats". In his book on metres, Terentianus Maurus explains: "For the iambus itself remains in six places, and for that reason the name senarius is given; but a beat is made three times, hence it is called a trimeter; because when scanning we join together the feet in pairs." Terentianus also indicates that teachers of metre would click their fingers or tap their foot in time with the second foot in each metron, that is, the one which is usually an iamb, not a spondee, dactyl or an anapaest. "In this way what was a senarius becomes a trimeter".

A question therefore is whether, if there was a beat, there was one beat per foot or one every metron (group of two feet); and if it was one per metron, on which of the two long elements was it made?

Should the following trochaic septenarius be read with eight beats, for example?

Or is it better to read it with four beats, as follows?

After examining the evidence Moore suggests that in Roman comedy, the pipe-player "provided some emphasis to all strong elements, maintaining the sense of feet, but that the "beats" on the odd-numbered feet were stronger."

In his editions, Richard Bentley wrote an acute accent on the 1st, 3rd, and 5th long elements of a senarius, but Lindsay, following Terentianus, wrote one on the 2nd, 4th and 6th; in the trochaic septenarius, both agreed in accenting the 1st, 3rd, 5th and 7th long element. On the other hand, Gratwick in his edition of the Menaechmi edition, and Barsby in his edition of Terence's Eunuchus, mark the position of the strong element in each foot in the iambo-trochaic metres. It is argued that this can help the student with reading the verse aloud.

| – – uu – | – – u – || – – u – | u – – | ia7
"I am happy, however my own situation may be, that things have turned out for my brother as he wishes."

But though such markings may help students with scansion and the rhythm with which the line should be read, it is not generally thought that the accent was heard on those syllables if there was a clash between the ictus and the natural accent of the word. Where the word accent is at odds with the ictus, it is more natural to follow the accent (just as is the case when reading Virgil).

Another question is whether, if there was a perceptible beat, it was heard at regular intervals as in modern western music, or irregularly. Gratwick argues that the ictus was not isochronous, but that the timing depended on whether the anceps syllables were long or short. Not all scholars agree with this, however; Pearson, in his edition of Aristoxenus's treatise on rhythm, argues that it was possible or likely that in an iambic line the length of the syllables was adjusted to make the bars of equal length.

Various illustrations from the time of the Roman empire show a  wearing a sort of clapper, called a scabellum, on one foot. One such mosaic, showing a  accompanying a dancer, is illustrated in Moore's book Music in Roman Comedy. Cicero mentions the word in connection with a mime performance. However, there is no evidence that such a clapper was used to accompany Roman comedies.

Prosody of Plautus and Terence

Resolved elements
Any element in an iambic or trochaic line except the last two can be resolved into (i.e. replaced by) two short syllables (marked "uu" in the scansions below). The final element of the line is always a single syllable, either long or brevis in longo (i.e. a short final syllable which counted as long, as in the word Geta in the first example below).

| – uu – uu | – – – – | uu – u – | (ia6)
"So who will give me the drachma back, if I give it to you?"

The following example, in the trochaic septenarius metre, has four resolved elements. The first, second, and fourth of these are a resolved :

| – uu – uu | – – uu – || – – – uu | – u – | (tr7)
"What am I to do? From where am I to find money for this man so suddenly, wretched me!"

(iambic shortening)

The prosody and grammar of Plautus and Terence differ slightly from that of later poets such as Virgil and Ovid.

As a rule,  is found in places in iambo-trochaic metres where either an  element or a  element is resolved into two short syllables. Examples of the second type, where a longum element in the metre is resolved, are: .

Another place where iambic shortening frequently occurs is in the two short syllables of an anapaest (u u –), e.g. .

 is not compulsory, and it is possible for the same phrase to be found sometimes with and sometimes without iambic shortening. For example,  vs. ;  vs.  vs. .

Trinummus 153).

As the above examples show, the short syllable which causes the shortening is usually either a monosyllable or part of the same word as the shortened syllable.

Fattori therefore argues that this type should be regarded as a separate phenomenon from the normal iambic shortening described above.

Usually the shortened syllable is unaccented. Many scholars claim that the scansion can therefore give clues as to how Latin was pronounced in normal speech. For example, it is argued by Lindsay and others that in the phrase  "my darling", where the syllable lup is shortened, the accent was on the syllable -tās (this however is disputed by Radford). Another suggestion is that the phrase  "at my house", scanned (u – –), shows the normal pronunciation where púd is accented; but when it is scanned (u u –), the emphasis is on the word , i.e.,  "at my house".

Fattori (2021), however, disputes this and points out some cases where the shortened syllable is apparently accented, for example,  (Plaut. Most. 410).

Although iambic shortening is common in iambo-trochaic metres and anapaests, it is almost never found in cretics or bacchiacs. Iambic shortening is also occasionally found in the fragments of Early Latin tragedy and in Ennius's hexameters in a passage quoted by Apuleius (Apol. 39).

Elision
Elision (the removal or partial removal of a final vowel when the next word starts with a vowel or h) is "far more frequent and various in Plautus and Terence than in other Latin verse-writers". For example, in the second of the trochaic septenarii lines which follow there are no fewer than six elisions:

| –  u –  – | –  u – – || – u – – | – u – | tr7
| uu u uu – | uu u – – || – u – – | – u – |
"Aha! there he is about to come here; I will go to meet him,
nor shall I ever allow this man to come here near to this house today."

This line of Terence has five elisions:

| – – u uu | – – – – | – – u – | ia6
O the audacity! He's even coming to accuse me of his own accord!"

How exactly an elision was pronounced is unknown. It is possible that a short vowel was completely omitted. When a long vowel was involved, however, it is probable that an element of it could still be heard, for example in the following line, where complete omission would cause ambiguity:

| – u – u | – u uu – || – u – – | – u – |
"You are giving an excellent service excellently for the most Excellent; and you will be rewarded well for your gift."

Sometimes in Plautus (but not in Terence) there can be a hiatus (i.e. no elision) between vowels at the break between the two halves of a verse, that is after the fifth element of a senarius or the 8th element of a septenarius. There can also be brevis in longō at this point. But frequently at the break there is no hiatus but an elision. Elision can also take place even when there is a change of speaker in the middle of a line.

Prodelision

Synizesis
However, if it suited the metre, they could also be kept separate.

Other prosodic points
Vowels which later became shortened before -t or -r retained their length in Plautus, e.g. , etc.

The words  were pronounced .

In both poets phrases like  could be pronounced with the scansion u u –. In Plautus (but not Terence) are also found phrases like  where the first word is scanned u u. Lindsay compares forms in later Latin such as  where the preposition is similarly reduced to a short syllable but not completely elided.

The initial word-accent is however disputed by Questa.

A mute plus liquid consonant (e.g. tr in ) did not make the previous syllable long in Plautus or Terence.

Some words ending in -e, such as  could be pronounced  before a consonant.

The masculine pronoun  "this man", which was later pronounced "hicc", was still pronounced with a single c in Plautus.

The combinations  and  can be pronounced with a short vowel in the first syllable, i.e. either | u u – | or | – u – |.

Iambo-trochaic "laws"
When the metres of Plautus and Terence came to be studied carefully in the 19th century, a number of "laws" or tendencies were discovered, which are described below.

Ritschl's law

The rule
Almost any long or anceps element can be resolved, that is, split into two short syllables. Ritschl's law states that when this happens the two short syllables must be either in the same word, or the first one is a monosyllable.

But resolutions such as * are not usually found except sometimes in anapaestic metres.

Exception 
Occasionally, when a long and anceps (– x) are realised as a tribrach (u u u), the law may be broken.

Hermann-Lachman law

But four-syllable words with an elided last syllable were apparently allowed, e.g. , .

Another exception to the law is the word , which usually has a short -o in expressions such as  "something" or  "someone". This seems to be treated as if it was a compound .

This rule applies in Latin but not in Greek, where a word like  can replace an iamb.

Both Ritschl's law and the Hermann-Lachman law are less strictly observed in the short syllables of anapaestic metres.

Meyer's law

The rule

Thus a word with an iambic ending is freely allowed at the end of an iambic metron, like  in the line below:

| –  –  u  – | –  –  –  uu | –  –  u  – | ia6
"But after a lover approached promising money..."

| uu –  –  – | –  –  –  – | –  –  u  – | ia6
"I ordered it, and my wife said she would do it"

The reason for Meyer's law is believed (at any rate by most English-speaking scholars) to be connected with the Latin word accent. In the original Greek version of these metres, the 3rd element of an iambic metron as always short: | x – u – |; similarly the second element of a trochaic metron is always short: | – u – x |. The effect of Meyer's law was to ensure that the element which was short in Greek was also short in Latin, or, if long, was at least "light", that is, unaccented.

Exceptions
Although Meyer's law is observed in the majority of cases, there are some lines where it is not observed; for example, in the following line from Terence in the word  "very greatly" there is a long accented syllable in the third element of the metron, possibly to emphasise the word:

| u  –  –  – | –  –  –  – | –  –  u  – | ia6
"I love and praise and oh, so badly miss her!"

The following example comes from Plautus:

| – – – uu | – – – – | uu – u – | ia6
"this Amphitruo is now in command of the legions"

When Meyer's law is violated in the first metron (which is less common), the following element is usually a monosyllable, maintaining the usual caesura:

| uu – – – | – – uu – | uu – u – | ia6
"Let him come whenever he wants, so I don't have to wait."

Luchs's law (the Bentley-Luchs law)

The rule
If this is the case, then the preceding anceps must be long. (This law also applies to the 7th–8th elements of ia7 and ia8.)

It is argued that the rationale behind this law is that an iambic word at the beginning of the third metron might give the false impression that the line had come to an end. The rule inevitably means that when the last word is disyllabic, the word-accent will be heard on the first element of the metron (i.e. contrary to the presumed ictus); but apparently in the last metron rhythmical considerations were more important than stress.

Exceptions

This is fairly common in Plautus, but is not apparently found in Terence. The following examples are all from Plautus.

The  resembles the 8th position of an iambic septenarius or iambic octonarius, where similarly there may be a hiatus or a  preceded by a short element and followed by a pause (see below).

With hiatus
Sometimes where there is a hiatus, there is also a change of speaker (this kind is sometimes found even in Terence):

| uu – u – | – – u – | – – u – | ia6
"By Pollux, you have a good memory!" – "It's the dinners which prompt it!"

But in other instances there is no change of speaker:

 ia6
| – – u – | – uu u – | u – u – | ia6
"I believe I saw a woman in the house"

| – – – – | – – u – | – – u – | ia6
"I am walking among mortals in broad daylight"

With brevis in longo
In other examples there is no hiatus between the words, but there is a brevis in longo, that is, the word ends in a short syllable where metrically a long syllable is expected:

| uu – – – | – – u – | – – u – | ia6
"He was able: I have been free now for more than five years."

| – – – uu | – – u – | u – u – | ia6
"So don't you go too far away from the house."

 
| – – – – | – u – – | – u – – | – u – | tr7
"And to invent a trick for getting money."

| – u – – | uu – – – | – – – – | – u – | tr7
"The other things which we wish to use, we buy with 'Greek faithfulness' (i.e. paying with promises)."

With tribrach

| – – u – | – – u –  | uu – u – | ia6
or:
| – – u – | – – u uu | u  – u – | ia6
"What, its foreleg?" – "I meant to say, its hind leg."

| uu u – uu | – – uu – | – – – – | – u – | tr7
or:
| uu u uu u | – – uu – | – – – – | – u – | tr7
"My master is stretched over with the skin of an elephant, not his own."

With quasi-pyrrhics
There are certain instances where a quasi-pyrrhic word like  comes at the  position apparently without its second vowel being shortened. It is therefore unclear whether the long vowel is retained in such words, or whether they can be counted as instances of :

.
"she has shown herself to me now from her soul"
| – – – – | – – u – | u – u – | ia6

In the following examples, there is the possibility of scanning with a tribrach (breaking Ritschl's law) rather than a :

| uu u – uu | – uu – – | uu – uu – | – u – | tr7
| uu u uu u | – uu – – | uu – uu – | – u – | tr7 ?
"I was dreadfully afraid before I went indoors; I was practically dead".

. (tr7)
| – u – uu | – u – u | – – uu – | – u – | tr7
| – u uu u | – u – u | – – uu – | – u – | tr7 ?
"what I'm saying is just my opinion, I don't know for sure"

| – – – – | – – u – | uu – u – | ia6
| – – – – | – – u uu | u – u – | ia6 (preferred)
"You are from top to bottom nothing but wisdom"

Iambic metres

Iambic senarius
Used for the prologues of plays and for the more serious speeches, the iambic senarius (ia6) is the most common metre in Roman comedy and is the only metre which was unaccompanied by music. It is more common in Terence than in Plautus.

The Latin line is based on the Greek iambic trimeter, which goes as follows (in the notation used here, – is a long syllable, u a short one, and x an anceps, that is, either long or short):
| x – u – | x – u – | x – u – | (Greek)
The Latin equivalent of this is slightly different and has anceps syllables in place of the first and second shorts:
| x – x – | x – x – | x – u – | (Latin)

However, the various  syllables in the line are not equal. The following table shows the percentage of anceps positions in the iambic senarius which are short, long, or resolved. It is based on a count by J. J. Schlicher of the 533 iambic senarius lines in Plautus's . As can be seen, apart from the 11th element, which is compulsorily short, a single short syllable is most commonly found in the 3rd and 7th positions in the line, i.e. the positions which are always short in Greek. The 9th element is the anceps position least likely to be represented by a single short syllable.

Resolution of an anceps element into two short syllables is most common in the 1st element of an iambic senarius line, very rare in the 5th.

Another feature that can be seen on this table is that the anceps elements in middle of the line (positions 3, 5, and 7) tend to be unaccented. Because of Meyer's law, it is rare for positions 3 or 7 to be accented unless they are short.

In most (but not all) iambic senarii there is a word-break or caesura after the 5th element, corresponding to the dieresis after the 8th element in the trochaic septenarius. However, as can be seen from the examples below, there is often no break in the sense at this point. One result of this caesura is that the fourth element of the line usually coincides with the word-accent, while the third is unaccented.

In lines where there is no caesura after the fifth element there is one after the seventh (often combined with one after the 3rd element). An example is the fourth line of the Terence example below.

The iambic senarius is often used for exposition and explaining a stuation, for example in the prologue of almost every play, such as Plautus's Amphitruo:
 
 
 

| – –  – –  | u – – uu | –  – u – | ia6
| – uu – –  | u – – –  | –  – u – |
| – –  u –  | – – – –  | –  – u – |
| – –  – uu | – – – –  | uu – u – |
| – –  – uu | – – – –  | –  – u – |
"This city is Thebes. In that house lives
Amphitruo, born in Argos from an Argive father,
with whom Alcmena is married, daughter of Electer (Electryon).
This Amphitruo is now in command of the legions,
for the Theban people are having a war with the Teloboans."

The iambic senarius is also used for dialogue, especially when old men are speaking (6235 out of 7659 lines spoken by old men, that is more than 80% of their dialogue, are in this metre). An example is the following extract from Terence's Andria (35-39) spoken by the old man Simo to his freedman Sosia:

 
 

| uu –  –  – | –  –  u  –  | –  –  u  – | ia6
| u  –  –  – | –  –  –  uu | –  –  u  – |
| –  –  –  – | u  –  –  –  | –  –  u  – |
| –  uu –  – | –  –  –  –  | u  –  u  – |
| u  uu –  – | –  uu –  –  | –  –  u  – |

"After I bought you, how from childhood onwards 
your servitude with me was always just and mild
you know. From a slave I made you to be my freedman,
because you used to serve me generously.
I paid you the greatest price which I had."

Iambic septenarius
| x – x – | x – u – || x – x – | x – – |
The character of this metre is different from the iambic senarius or trochaic septenarius. In Plautus there almost always a break (diaeresis) in the middle of the line. Unless the diaeresis (central break) is omitted, then by Meyer's law there is always a short syllable in the penultimate place before the break. At the end of the line there is always a word accent on the penultimate element.

Although not so frequent as the senarius, the iambic septenarius (ia7) is also reasonably common in Roman comedy. Certain characters and plays use this metre more than others; in Plautus' Pseudolus, for example, there are only ten lines of iambic septenarii, occurring in sections of one or two lines, and in Amphitruo this metre does not occur at all. But in Rudens there are 204 lines  (290-413, 682–705, 1281–1337), in Miles Gloriosus 211 (354-425, 874–946, 1216–1283), in Curculio 46 (487-532), and in Asinaria 322 (381-503, 545–745).

The iambic septenarius is sometimes known as the "laughing metre". A typical use is the light-hearted banter of the two cunning slaves, Leonida and Libanus, in Plautus's Asinaria, when ribbing each other. Here Leonida speaks:

 

 
 
 

| uu –  –  – | –  – u – || –  –  –  –  | –  –  – | ia7
| –  uu u  – | –  – u – || –  –  u  uu | –  –  – |
| –  uu –  – | uu – u – || uu –  –  –  | u  –  – |
| uu –  –  – | –  – u – || uu –  u  –  | –  uu – |
| uu –  –  – | –  – u – || u  –  –  –  | –  –  – |
| uu uu u  – | –  – u – || –  –  uu –  | u  –  – |
| uu –  u  – | –  – u – || –  –  –  –  | u  –  – |
| –  –  –  – | –  – u – || u  –  –  –  | –  –  – |
"By Pollux, you could not praise your own virtues
as well as I could, all those things which at home or in war you've done wrong!
Indeed, by Pollux, there are a lot of things that can be mentioned to your credit:
when you defrauded those who trusted you, when you were unfaithful to your master,
when you deliberately perjured yourself with invented words,
when you made holes in walls, when you were caught stealing,
and all the times you pleaded your case when hanging in front of eight
burly aggressive men, sturdy whippers!"

But the metre is also associated with love. In Miles the three scenes with iambic septenarii are all scenes where a courtesan is the protagonist, and there is similar use in other plays where a prostitute is acting or being discussed. In Terence's Eunuchus, iambic septenarii are used when the beautiful Pamphila first appears, and when her lover Chaerea comes out after raping her.

In Terence the metre is often used by love-struck young men, as in the following exchange (Heauton Timorumenos 679–89) between the young man Clinia and the cunning slave, Syrus:

| –  –  u  –  | –  –  u  – || –  –  –  –  | –  uu – | ia7
| –  –  –  –  | –  –  u  – || –  –  –  –  | u  –  – |
| –  uu –  uu | –  uu u  – || –  –  u  –  | u  –  – |
| –  –  –  –  | u  uu u  – || u  –  u  –  | –  –  – |
| uu –  –  –  | –  –  u  – || uu –  –  uu | u  –  – |
| u  –  –  uu | –  –  u  – || –  –  –  –  | u  –  – |
CLI. O my Syrus, did you hear, do tell me! SYR. How could I not? I was there with you.
CLI. Have you ever heard anything turn out so well for anyone? SYR. No, no one!
CLI. And so may the gods love me, I am now delighted not so much for my own sake
as for hers, whom I know to be worthy of any honour.
SYR. I am sure you’re right. But now, Clinia, listen to me in turn;
for we must do something about your friend’s situation too to make sure it is secure.

In Plautus, there is usually a clean break between the two halves of the line, and this is often true of Terence too. However, sometimes Terence smooths over the break with an elision, or even omits the break altogether.

| – uu – – | u – u – | u / – – uu | – – – |
You run to meet the boys, Parmeno, and help them with their loads.

Iambic octonarius

 | x – x – | x – u – || x – x – | x – u – | type a
 | x – x – | x – x – |  x – x – | x – u – | type b

The iambic octonarius has two kinds, one with a break in the middle of the line, as the first pattern above. In this kind there is always a short syllable in position 7. But often, instead of a mid-line break, there is a caesura or word-break 7 elements before the end of the line. This second kind of iambic octonarius, which has a break after the 9th element, is very similar to a trochaic septenarius but with an extra syllable at the beginning, and in some passages (such as Terence, Phormio 465–504) the metre switches back and forth between tr7 and ia8.

Cicero quotes some lines from the tragedy Iliona by Pacuvius in which the ghost of Hector begs his mother to bury him:

| – uu u – | – – – uu | – / – – – | – – u – | ia8
| – – – uu | – – u  – | – / – – – | – – u – |
"And do not allow my half-eaten remains, with denuded bones,
to be spread hideously across the ground smeared with gore"

In the first type, when the break is in the middle of the line, there may be a hiatus or a brevis in longo (a short syllable standing for a long element) at that point, as in the word ingerĕ in the first of the two lines below:

| – – u – | u – u – || uu  – u  – | – – u – | ia8
| – – u – | – – u – |  – / – uu – | – – u – |

"You who have the jar, bring in some water; make sure the pot is full for the cook;
you with the axe I'm putting in charge of the wood-cutting province."

The iambic octonarius was apparently often used in Roman tragedy for messenger speeches, and in Plautus it is also used by slave messengers, as in this account of the preparations of a battle in the Amphitruo (203–210) sung by the slave Sosia. In this section there is generally a word-break after the 8th element, and the 7th element is short:

 

 
 

| – uu u –  | –  – u – || uu – – –  | – uu u – | ia8 (type a)
| – uu – uu | –  – u – || u  – – –  | – –  u – |
| – –  – –  | uu – u – || –  – u –  | – –  u – |
| – uu – uu | –  – u – || –  – – –  | – –  u – |
| – uu – –  | –  – u – || –  – u –  | – –  u – |
| u –  – uu | –  – u – || –  – – –  | – –  u – |
| u –  – –  | uu – u – || uu – – uu | – –  u – |
| – uu – –  | –  – u – || –  – u –  | – –  u – |
"In the beginning, when we arrived there, as soon as we touched land,
immediately Amphitruo picks out some men, the leaders of the chiefs;
he delegates them and orders them to speak his judgement to the Teloboans:
if, without violence and without war, they were prepared to hand over what they had stolen and those who had stolen it,
if they gave back what they had carried off, he would immediately lead the army
back home, the Greeks would leave their territory, and give them
peace and leisure; but if they were otherwise minded, and didn't give what he was asking,
in that case with all his force and men he would attack their town."

However, in the account of the aftermath of the same battle in Plautus's Amphitruo (256-261) the style changes. In this section the lines run smoothly on, without any central dieresis. Frequently the 7th element is long. They do, however, mostly have a word-break after the 9th element, which makes the second half resemble the trochaic septenarius:

 
 
 
 
 

| – –  u –  | – – u  –  | – / –  – – | – – u – | ia8 (type b)
| – –  u –  | – – –  –  | – / uu – – | – – u – | 
| – –  – uu | u – –  –  | –   –  – – | – – u – |
| – –  u –  | – – –  –  | u / –  u – | – – u – | 
| – uu – –  | u – u  –  | – / –  – – | – – u – |
| – –  – –  | u – uu –  | – / uu u – | – – u – |
| – uu u –  | u – u  uu | u / –  – – | – – u – |
"But finally night with its intervention ended the battle.
The next day into our camp from the city the chiefs came to us weeping;
with veiled hands they begged us to forgive their wrong-doing,
and they surrendered themselves, and all divine and human things, the city and their children
all for jurisdiction and judgment to the Theban people.
Afterwards on account of his courage my master Amphitruo was given a gold cup,
with which King Pterela used to drink. This is what I shall tell the mistress."

The iambic octonarius is used more often by Terence (885 lines) than by Plautus (382 lines). In Terence's Eunuchus, this metre is particularly associated with one of the two brothers, Chaerea, who has 88 lines in this metre. The following passage from Terence's Adelphoe ("The Brothers") is sung by another of two brothers, Ctesipho, as he enters the stage:

 
 
 
 
 

| –  –  – uu | u –  u – || uu  uu – uu | u  –  u – | ia8 (type a)
| –  uu – –  | – –  u – || –   –  – uu | –  uu u – |
| –  –  – –  | – uu u – || –   –  – uu | –  –  u – |
| –  uu – uu | – –  – – |  – / –  – –  | uu –  u – | ia8 (type b)
| uu –  – –  | u –  u – |  u / uu – –  | uu –  u – |
| –  uu – –  | u –  u – |  – / –  u –  | uu –  u – |
"From any man, when there's a need, you would be glad to receive a favour,
but in truth what is really nice is if someone does a favour who ought to do one.
O brother, brother, how can I praise you enough? One thing I know for sure,
I shall never be able to speak highly enough of your virtue.
And so I think I have this one thing above all more than anyone else,
that no man has a brother more endowed with the most excellent qualities!"

The style changes halfway through the above lines: in the first three lines there is a central dieresis, but in the second half the lines run on, and there is a word break after element 9.

Trochaic metres

Trochaic septenarius

1st type
| – x – x | – x – x || – x – x | – u – |

The second most common metre in Roman comedy in terms of lines (or the commonest, in terms of the number of words) is the trochaic septenarius (tr7). Like the other long iambic and trochaic lines, it is believed to have been chanted to the music of the tibiae (double pipes). There is usually a diaeresis in the centre of the line, and there may sometimes also be a hiatus (lack of elision) or brevis in longo (a short syllable made long by position) at this point. Trochaic lines generally start with a word which is stressed on the first syllable, making it clear that the line has a trochaic not an iambic rhythm.

According to an ancient metrical theory, the Greek version of this metre (trochaic tetrameter catalectic) was composed of an iambic trimeter with a cretic foot (– u –) added at the beginning. This seems to be true of the Latin trochaic septenarius too: the word break (dieresis or caesura) is in the same place seven elements before the end of the line, and Meyer's law and the locus Jacobsohnianus apply in the same way to both lines.

The trochaic septenarius is a more lively metre than the iambic senarius. It is the "vehicle for excited talk" (Lindsay 1922:282), unlike the senarius, which is the vehicle for quiet talk, often used by old men. A play will often end with a passage in trochaics. In Plautus there is also a strong tendency in trochaics for the word accent to coincide with the metrical ictus of the feet.

In the following passage the slave Sosia protests when the god Mercury, disguised as Sosia, prevents the real Sosia from entering his own house:

 
 
 

| –  u  –  – | uu u –  – || –  uu – – | – u – | tr7
| –  –  –  – | –  u –  – || –  –  – – | – u – |
| –  –  –  – | –  – –  u || –  u  – – | – u – |
| –  uu –  – | –  – –  – || –  –  – – | – u – |
| –  uu –  uu| –  – uu – || uu –  – – | – u – |
| –  u  –  u | uu – uu – || –  u  – – | – u – |
| uu u  uu u | uu – –  – || –  u  – – | – u – |
What, dammit, aren't I Amphitruo's slave Sosia?
Didn't our ship come here last night from the Persian port,
which brought me? Didn't my master send me here?
Am I not now standing in front of our house? Isn't there a lantern in my hand?
Am I not talking? Am I not awake? Didn't this man just punch me with his fists?
He did, by Hercules! Since my wretched jaw is still aching!
So what am I waiting for? Why don't I just go into our house?

In the centre of the trochaic septenarius line (corresponding to the caesura in the iambic senarius) there is usually a word-break, and in Plautus (though not in Terence) there is sometimes a hiatus (lack of elision) at this point, as in the second line below:

 

| uu – – u | – u – – || uu – uu – | – u – | tr7
| –  u – – | – u – – || –  u –  – | – u – |
I'll do what you order; I'll get a two-bladed axe and I'll hack off
this old man's meat as far as his bones and chop his guts to pieces.

The same tendencies which apply to the alternating anceps syllables in an iambic senarius also apply in a similar way to a trochaic septenarius, namely that those elements that are always short in Greek (the 1st, 3rd, and 5th anceps syllables) are long in about 60% of lines; while those which are anceps in Greek (namely the 2nd, 4th and 6th anceps in the trochaic septenarius) are long in about 80% to 90% of lines. Meyer's Law and Luchs' Law also operate in the same places, counting from the end of the line backwards, as in the senarius.

2nd type
Just as the type b iambic octonarius resembles a trochaic septenarius in having a break 7 elements before the end instead of 8, so there is also a trochaic septenarius which resembles a type a iambic octonarius by putting a break 8 elements before the end:

| – – – – | – u – || uu – – uu | – – u – | tr7
| u – – – | – – u – || – – – – | – – u – | ia8
"Who is more fortunate than me and more full of loveliness?
How, how am I to thank you for this news? I don't know how."

Trochaic octonarius
| – x – x | – x – x || – x – x | – x – – |

Much less frequent is the trochaic octonarius (tr8), which is found in both poets. It is mostly very sporadically used with just a line or two here or there in the midst of other metres. The following four-line stretch comes from Plautus' Pseudolus (161–164), where the pimp Ballio is giving instructions to three slaves:

| uu – uu – | uu – – – || uu – uu –  | uu u –  – |
| –  – –  – | –  u – – || –  – –  uu | –  – uu – |
| –  u –  u | –  u – – || uu u –  –  | –  u –  – |
| –  u –  u | –  u – u || –  u –  u  | –  u –  – |

"You, I'm instructing that the house should be sparkling clean. You've been told what to do; hurry up, go inside.
You, be couch-strewer. You, clean the silver and also set it out.
When I come back from the forum, make sure I find everything ready,
and that everything is turned, sprinkled, dusted, strewn, washed, and polished!"

In the above quotation there is a contrast between the anapaestic first two lines, where the double short syllables suggest bustle and hurry, and the last two lines, where the repeated trochaic rhythm emphasises how everything has got to be when it is ready. If Gratwick is right that the feet were not isometric, then the fourth line above, with a short syllable in each anceps position, must have taken less time to say than the first.

Sometimes both in this metre and in the trochaic septenarius the verses split into four equal parts, as in the last line above.

In Terence lines of trochaic octonarii (interspersed with trochaic septenarii) tend to occur in clusters at moments of great emotional intensity, such as at Hecyra 516–34.

A common pattern in both poets, but especially in Terence, is for trochaic octonarii to be followed first by one or two lines of trochaic septenarii, then by one or more iambic octonarii. This tr8-tr7-ia8 pattern occurs 48 times in Terence, and 6 times in Plautus.

Polymetric iambo-trochaic passages
In the examples seen so far the same metre is used for several lines at a time; but a glance at Moore's database shows that iambic and trochaic lines are often mixed together, as in the passage below from Terence's Phormio (485-492), which Moore discusses in an article. In these lines the young man Phaedria pleads with the slave-owner Dorio for more time to raise the money to buy his girlfriend; Phaedria's cousin Antipho and the slave Geta secretly listen in on the conversation.

Here the iambic octonarius and iambic senarius are used when Dorio is denying Phaedria's request. When he seems willing to listen and the plot seems to be moving forward, the trochaic septenarius is used. The aside by the eavesdropping Antipho and his slave Geta (between dashes below) is in the distinctive iambic septenarius. It is possible that in the line with ia6 the music stopped altogether for a few moments:

| –  u  – |
| –  –  u  – | –  –  u  – || u  –  –  –  | u  –  u – | ia8
| –  –  –  – | uu –  –  – || –  –  uu –  | –  u  – | tr7
| –  –  –  – | –  u  –  – || –  u  –  uu | –  u  – | tr7
| –  uu –  – | –  –  uu – || –  u  –  –  | –  u  – | tr7
| –  –  –  – | –  uu –  – |  –  –  u  –  |           ia6
| uu –  –  – | –  –  –  – || u  –  uu uu | –  uu – | ia7
| –  uu –  – | uu u  –  u || –  u  –  –  | –  u  – | tr7
PH. Dorio! 
Listen, I beg you! DO. I'm not listening! PH. Just a little! DO. No, let me go!
PH. Listen to what I'm saying. DO. But I'm tired of hearing the same things a thousand times!
PH. But now I'm going to say something which you'll want to hear. DO. Speak, I'm listening.
PH. Can’t I beg you to wait for these three days? – Where are you off to now!
DO. I was wondering if you were going to bring me anything new. – AN. (aside) O no!
I'm afraid in case the pimp… GE. Stitches up a plan in his head? I fear the same! –
PH. Don't you believe me? DO. You're raving! PH. But if I give a pledge? DO. Just stories!

Anapaestic metres
Anapaestic metres are used frequently by Plautus (about 4.5% of all his lines), but are not found in Terence. They are based on the foot | uu – |; two feet make a metron or "dipody". The frequent substitution of dactyls (– uu), spondees (– –) or proceleusmatics (uu uu) for anapaests (uu –), and the frequent use of brevis breviāns and synizesis are typical of anapaestic metres.

, which doesn't happen in iambo-trochaic except when the first word is a monosyllable.

Anapaestic lines are usually based on the dimeter or quaternarius, that is a length of two metra, or four feet. According to the ancient grammarian Marius Victorinus, it is characteristic of anapaestic poetry that there is usually a word-break at the end of every metron or dipody; in Seneca's plays this is always the case. In Plautus it is mostly true, but there are exceptions.

In Greek anapaestic poetry it is generally assumed that the verse-ictus was heard on the second half of the foot. However, in Plautus, except in the second half of the anapaestic septenarius, the word-stress generally comes on the first half of each foot. For those scholars who believe there was no ictus in ancient poetry, this presents no problem; the fact that each metron usually ends with a word-break automatically means that the stress will be heard on the early part of the feet. But for those that support the idea of ictus, it does present a problem. As Lindsay puts it, "It seems difficult to believe that the same poet, who in other metres so successfully reconciles accent with ictus, should tolerate lines like: 
Trin. 239: blandiloquentulus, harpagŏ, mendāx, 
Bacch. 1088: stultī, stolidī, fatuī, fungī, bardī, blennī, buccōnēs, 
Pers. 753: hostibus victīs, cīvibus salvīs, etc."

Other Roman writers who wrote anapaests, such as Seneca and Boethius, also regularly placed the word-accent on the beginning of each foot. Whether Roman poets wrote anapaests without regard for ictus, or whether the Roman anapaest differed from the Greek in that the ictus came on the beginning of each foot, as in the trochaic metre, is unclear. For this reason, the ictus has not been marked in the samples below. Some half lines (such as | u u – u u – | u u – – – |) are identical in the trochaic and the anapaestic metres; and the tendency to form "square" verses is another point in common with the trochaic metre.

Anapaestic septenarius
This metre is used only by Plautus. It is a catalectic metre in which the last foot is shortened to a single long element. The basic scheme is as follows:

| uu – uu – | uu – uu – || uu – uu – | uu – – |

The anapaestic foot | u u – | is frequently replaced by a spondee | – – | or a dactyl | – u u | and occasionally by a proceleusmatic | u u u u |. In the first half of the line, as in the anapaestic octonarius, the word-accent generally comes on the beginning of each foot. However, in the second half the stress tends to swing the other way, with the accent on the second half of each foot.

Apart from a long stretch of 82 lines in Miles Gloriosus, this metre is usually used sparingly, often with just a line or two mixed with other anapaestic metres. Frequently those who speak in this metre are old men or women. Here is a passage from the Bacchides (1160–65) where two old men, Nicobulus and Philoxenus, are talking:

 

 
 

| – uu – –  | –  – uu – || –  – uu –  | uu –  – | an7
| – –  – uu | –  – uu – || uu – uu –  | uu uu – |
| – –  – uu | –  – uu – || –  – uu uu | –  –  – |
| – uu – uu | –  – –  – || uu – –  –  | –  –  – |
| uu – uu – | uu – –  – || uu – uu –  | –  –  – |
| uu – uu – | –  – –  – || uu – uu –  | –  uu – |

NIC. "But what's the problem? Even though I myself think I already know full well what it is,
all the same I'm keen to hear it from you. PHIL. D'you see this girl? NIC. I do. PHIL. She's not a bad woman.
NIC. By Pollux, she is a bad one, and you're worthless! PHIL. In short, I'm in love. NIC. You're in love? PHIL. I am indeed.
NIC. You disgusting man, how dare you become a lover at your age! PHIL. Why not?
NIC. Because it's a scandal! PHIL. What need for words? I'm not angry with my son,
and it's not fair that you should be angry with yours. If they're in love, they are doing wisely."

The longest passage of anapaestic septenarii is  1011–93. According to Moore there is a close resemblance between the metre in this passage and trochaic septenarii. The German classicist Marcus Deufert claims that the style of writing in these lines is different from the usual anapaests, in that it is more regular and there are more long syllables. The passage starts as follows, with a conversation between the slave Palaestrio and the maidservant Milphīdippa, who pretends that she doesn't know that Palaestrio's master is standing listening. The passage starts with trochaic septenarius, the switches to anapaestic septenarius. If the two are compared, it can be seen that the first half of both metres is very similar, but the rhythm differs in the second half:

 

               ...     || uu –  –  – | –  u – | tr7
| –  – –  – | – uu – – || uu u  –  – | –  u – |
| uu – uu – | – –  – – || uu uu –  – | –  – – | an7
| uu – –  – | – –  – – || uu –  uu – | –  – – |
| uu – –  – | – uu – – || –  uu –  – | uu – – |
| – uu –  – | – –  – – || –  –  –  – | –  – – |
| –  – –  – | – –  – – || uu –  uu – | –  – – |
MIL. "I wish I had the opportunity of meeting the person on whose account I have come outside!"
PAL. "There will be an opportunity, and what you hope for will happen: be of good cheer, and don't worry!
There's a certain man who knows where it is, that thing you're looking for." MIL. "Who's that I heard here?"
PAL. "An ally in your councils and a sharer in your counsels!"
MIL. "In that case I won't hide what I'm hiding." PAL. "On the contrary, you're both hiding it and not hiding it!"
MIL. "How can that be?" PAL. "You're hiding it from people you can't trust, but I'm someone you can completely trust."

Anapaestic octonarius
| uu – uu – | uu – uu – || uu – uu – | uu – uu – |
Again, substitution of dactyl | – uu | or spondee | – – | or proceleusmatic | uu uu | for anapaest | uu – | is very common. As in a trochaic line, the word-accent usually comes on the first syllable of each foot, and unlike in the anapaestic septenarius, this is true of both halves of the line.

In the following extract from Plautus's Pseudolus (133-7), the pimp Ballio summons his slaves outside to give them instructions to prepare the house for his birthday:

 
 
 

| –  –  uu –  | –  – –  – || uu uu –  uu | – uu –  – | an8
| –  –  –  –  | –  – –  – || uu –  –  –  | – –  uu – |
| uu uu –  –  | –  – uu – || –  uu –  –  | – –  –  – |
| uu uu –  uu | uu – –  – || –  uu –  –  | – –  –  – |
| –  –  uu –  | uu – uu – || uu –  uu –  | – uu –  – |

"Come out, come on, come out, you lazy ones, worthless to own and a waste of money to buy,
To none of whom does it ever come into their mind to do the right thing;
and whom, unless I try this example (uses whip), it's impossible to get any work from them.
I've never seen any men more like donkeys, their ribs are so calloused with blows!
If you hit them you do yourself more harm than them, they're such whip-wearers-out by nature!"

After these five lines of anapaests, Ballio reverts to a mixture of trochaic and iambic lines for the rest of his speech.

In the following passage from Plautus's Rudens (220–228), five lines of anapaestic octonarii are followed by four of anapaestic septenarii. In this scene Ampelisca, a slave girl who has survived a shipwreck, is looking for her fellow slave Palaestra. The five octonarii go as follows:

| –  uu uu – | –  uu –  – || – –  uu – | – –  – – | an8
| uu uu –  – | uu uu –  – || – uu –  – | – uu – – |
| uu –  uu – | –  –  –  – || – uu –  – | – –  – – |
| –  uu –  – | –  –  –  – || – uu uu – | – –  – – |
| –  uu –  – | –  –  uu – || – uu –  – | – –  – – |

"What is better for me, what better solution is there, than to separate my life from my body?
I am living so badly and there are so many depressing anxieties in my heart.
This is how things are: I don't care for life; I have lost the hope with which I used to comfort myself.
I have now run round everywhere and crept through all the hiding places
looking for my fellow slave, so that I can search her out with voice, eyes, and ears.

Anapaestic quaternarius
The anapaestic quaternarius is found in 152 lines, all in Plautus, mostly just one or two lines at a time. However, in Rudens (955–962) there are 13 anapaestic quaternarii, followed by a catalectic one. The passage begins as follows. It is a dialogue between two slaves, Trachalio and Gripus. Trachalio begins:

| –  uu –  –  | –  uu –  – | an4
| –  uu uu –  | –  –  –  – |
| –  –  –  uu | –  –  uu – |
| uu –  –  uu | –  –  –  – |
| uu –  –  –  | uu –  –  – |
| –  uu –  –  | uu –  uu – |
| –  uu –  uu | –  –  uu – |

I saw someone who was committing a theft;
I knew the master against whom it was being committed.
Afterwards I myself approach the thief
And I make a bargain with him on this condition:
"I know the person this theft has been done to;
Now if you are willing to give me half,
I won't say anything about it to the master."

In most lines there is a word-break between the two halves of the line, but not in all. In this Plautus differs from Seneca, who always puts a word-break at the end of each anapaestic metron.

Anapaestic systems
Anapaestic metra are often used in a long series or "system" where the division into lines is not always clear and may sometimes differ in different manuscript copies. Usually, however, the metra come in pairs, and in Plautus there is usually a word break at the end of the pair, but not always in the middle.

An example is the following from the Bacchides, where the old man Philobulus comes on stage and sings as follows (the first two lines are anapaestic septenarii):
 
 
 
 

 
 
 
 
 
 

| –  –  uu –  | –  –  –  – || – uu – – | – – – ||
| –  –  uu –  | uu –  –  – || – –  – – | – – – ||
| –  uu –  –  | –  –  uu – |
| –  uu –  –  | uu –  –  – |
| uu –  uu –  | uu –  –  – |
| –  –  –  –  | –  –  –  – |
| uu –  uu –  | –  uu –  – |
| –  uu –  uu | –  –  – ||
| –  uu –  –  | –  –  –  – |
| –  uu –  –  | –  –  uu – |
| –  uu –  uu | –  –  –  – |
| –  uu –  uu | –  –  uu – |

Of all that there are anywhere, ever have been, and ever will be in future
stupid people, idiots, nitwits, blockheads, fools, nincompoops and dolts,
I alone surpass them all by a long way
in stupidity and uneducated behaviour.
I'm done for! I'm ashamed! At my age
to have been twice made a fool of so unworthily!
The more I think about it, the more I'm furious
about the confusion my son has caused!
I'm lost! I'm torn up by the root,
I'm tortured in every possible way!
Every evil is catching up with me,
I've died by every kind of death!

Since the short lines above come in couplets, some editors such as Lindsay (Oxford Classical Text) write them as single long lines of octonarii or septenarii.

Bacchiac and cretic metres
The bacchiac (x – –) and cretic (– x –) metres (together with anapaests) are used in polymetric cantica (songs). They are mostly found in Plautus and are rare in Terence, who has only 4 lines of bacchiacs (Andria 481–84) and 15 of cretics (Andria 625–38, Adelphi 610–17); whereas Plautus has 530 lines of bacchiacs and 528 lines of cretics.

According to Eduard Fraenkel these two metres are "incomparably suited to the Latin language". They differ from anapaests in that popular pronunciations such as brevis breviāns and synizesis are avoided. The bacchiac is, however, very rare in Greek.

A law called Spengel and Meyer's law (similar to Meyer's law in the iambic senarius) applies to bacchiacs and cretics, namely that a polysyllabic word may not end on the 5th or 11th element of a bacchiac or on the 3rd or 9th element of a cretic unless the preceding anceps is short. To put it more simply, the elements marked x in bold in the patterns below cannot be both long and stressed:

| x – – | x – – |  x – – | x – – | (bacchiac)
| – x – | – u – || – x – | – u – | (cretic)

In bacchiacs the word-accent quite often comes after the short syllable (: u – – u – –), rather than before it, as it tends to with cretics (: – u – – u –); some editors, therefore, mark these elements as an ictus.

Bacchiac quaternarius
Bacchiacs may occur in various lengths, but by far the most common is the bacchiac quaternarius (ba4), with four feet (occurring in 427 lines). Sometimes either the first or the second half of a quaternarius is replaced by a bacchiac colon (bacol), which is a sequence of the form either | x – – x – | or | x – x – – |. According to Moore's database, ba2bacol occurs in 62 lines, bacolba2 in 20 lines, bacolbacol in 14 lines, bacol by itself in 10 lines.

| x – – | x – – | x – – | x – – |
The usual form of the foot is | u – – | or | – – – |, but variations such as | u – uu | and | uu – – | are also found. Sometimes other similar metres are mixed in. There is generally no word break (diaeresis) in the middle of the line.

The bacchiac is used both for humorous songs and for tragic. Often the metre is sung by women. In the following passage from the Bacchides (1131–1140a) the courtesan Bacchis and her sister mock the two old men Philoxenus and Nicobulus who have knocked on their door, calling them "sheep":

 
 
 
 

 
 
 
 

| u  – – | u – – | u – uu | u – – | ba4
| uu – – | – – – | u – –  | u – – |
| –  – – | u – – | u – uu | u – – |
| –  – – | – – – | u – –  | u – – |
| –  – – | u – – | u – –  | – – – |
| –  – – | u – – | u – –  | – – – |
| –  – – | u – | bacol
| –  – – | – – – | u – –  | u – – | ba4
| –  – – | u – – | u – –  | u – – |
| –  – – | u –   | u – –  | bacolba1 (or ba1bacol)
| u  – – | u – – | u – –  | u – – | ba4
| u  – – | u –   | u – –  | bacolba1 (or ba1bacol)

SISTER. By Castor, I think they're perfectly harmless.
PHIL. (aside) We deserve this, since we have come here!
BACCHIS. Let them be driven inside. SIS. I don't know what use that would be,
since they have neither milk nor wool. Let them stand outside.
They've paid all they were worth. All their fruit
has already fallen from them. Don't you see how, they're straggling
and walking about freely
on their own? No, I think they're silent because of their age;
they don't even bleat, even though they're away from the rest of the flock!
They seem stupid and not bad!
SIS. Let's go back inside, sister. – NIC. Wait right there,
both of you! These sheep want you!

The tenth and twelfth lines above illustrate the "syncopated" bacchiac rhythm, where one syllable is omitted from the foot. When this happens, there is generally a word-break after the syncopated foot.

Bacchiac senarius
Bacchiac rhythms can also be used for serious, contemplative songs, such as Alcumena's lament on the sudden departure of her husband in Plautus's Amphitruo 633ff, which begins:
 
  
 
  

| u  – – u – – || u  – – – – – || u – – u – – | ba6
| –  – – u – – || uu – – u – – | ba4
| u  – – uu – | colreiz
| uu – – uu – | colreiz
| u  – – – – – || u  – – u – – | ba4
| –  – – u – – || u  – – u – – || u – – u – – | ba6

Is it not the case that the amount of pleasure in life and in leading our existence is small
in comparison to what is disagreeable? So it has been allotted in each person's life.
So it has pleased the gods, that sadness should follow pleasure as her companion;
On the contrary, that more unpleasantness and evil should immediately follow, if anything nice happens.

In the above quotation there is always a word-break at the end of each metron, so that there is usually a word-stress on the penultimate element of each metron.

This particular metre (the bacchiac senarius) is very rare, occurring only in this passage. The words in aetāt(e) hominum are analysed by Questa as a colon reizianum, rather than a bacchiac with a hiatus after aetate.

Cretic quaternarius
Cretic metres are found in lengths of one to seven feet, but by far the most common cretic metre is the quaternarius, consisting of four feet. This occurs in 296 lines of Plautus and 9 lines of Terence:

| – x – | – u – || – x – | – u – |
The cretic metre consists of feet usually of the form | – x – |, although occasionally | uu u – | or | – u uu | can be found. Occasionally, as in lines 5 and 6 of the extract below, feet of other metres are mixed in, such as trochaic. In the quaternarius, there is usually a diaeresis (break) in the middle of the line, although elision may also be found at this point.

The cretic metre seems to have a more epic or tragic quality than the bacchiac. In the following passage, after a long description of preparations for a battle in stately iambic octonarii, the slave Sosia suddenly breaks into cretic quaternarii to describe the excitement of the battle itself (Amphitruo 219–247). The cretic passage begins as follows (note that the fourth and fifth lines contain trochaic elements):

 
 (tr7)
 (cr2+tr2)

| –  u – | – u – || – u – | – u – | 
| –  – – | – u – || – – – | – u – |
| –  – – | – u – || – u – | – u – |
| uu – – u | – – – – || uu – – uu | – u – | (tr7)
| –  u – | – u – | – – – uu | – u – | (cr2 + tr2)
| –  – – | – u – || – u – | – u – |

A line with both resolutions (uu u – and – u uu) is Amphitruo 235:

| – u – | uu u – || – u uu | – u – |
"Finally, as we wanted, our army is winning."

The same metre was also used in Roman tragedies, as in the following quotation from Ennius's Andromacha, cited more than once by Cicero:

| – u  – | – u – || – u – | – u – |
| – uu – | – u – || – u – | – u – |
| – u  – | – u – || – u – | – u – |

"What protection am I to seek or request? What help
may I depend on now in my exile or flight?
I am deprived of citadel and city. Who am I to approach? To whom may have recourse?"

The above tragic aria was presumably sung at a slow tempo. At other times, however, the cretic metre indicates a faster tempo than the iambics it follows, as with the battle description above, or the scene discussed by Moore (p. 332) from Plautus's Pseudolus 920ff, where Pseudolus tries to get Simia to speed up his walking, by changing from iambics to cretics:

| – u – | – u – || – u – | – u – |
P. Walk quickly therefore. S. No, I want to go at a leisurely pace!

Two lines later Simio changes the metre back into iambics to slow the pace:

| – uu – uu | – – u – |
S. Why are you hurrying? Slowly, don't be afraid!

Cretic colon and thymelicus
Often the first or the second half or both halves of a cretic quaternarius is replaced by a cretic colon (crcol), which is a sequence | – u – x – | or | – x – u – |. Cr2crcol occurs in 95 lines in the two poets, crcolcrcol in 26 lines, and crcolcr2 in 16 lines. Crcol by itself occurs in 19 lines.

Another possible ending for a cretic line is | – u u u – |, known as a thymelicus. The latter is almost always used for comic effect. Cr2thy occurs in 19 lines.

The following is sung by an old man called Simo in Plautus's Mostellaria (690–699):

 

| uu u – | –  u – | – u – u – | cr2crcol
| –  u – | –  u – | – u – u – | cr2crcol
| –  u – | –  u – | – u – u – | cr2crcol
| –  – – | –  u – | – u u u – | cr2thy
| –  u – | –  u – | – u – u – | cr2crcol
| uu u – | uu u – | – u u u – | cr2thy
| –  u – | –  u – | – u u u – | cr2thy
| –  u – | –  u – | – u – u – | cr2crcol
| –  u – | –  u – | – u – u – | cr2crcol  (or with ''scio'', cr2thy)
Nothing was better at my house this year than this,
nor any food which pleased me more!
My wife has given me an excellent lunch.
But now she's ordering me to go to bed with her. No way!
By chance I didn't notice at the time
when she gave me a better lunch than usual.
The old woman wanted to take me off into the bedroom.
But sleep after lunch isn't good. Be off with you!
Secretly I slipped out of the house.
My wife is completely angry with me in the house, I know!

Colon reizianum
The following metres used mainly by Plautus may also be mentioned.

The colon reizianum, named after the 18th-century classicist Friedrich Reiz // (1733–90) of Leipzig University, is a short piece of iambic metre of the following form:
| x – x – – |
The first anceps is almost always long; any of the first four elements (especially the first and third) can be replaced by two short syllables. Sometimes the colon reizianum is used on its own (e.g. Casina 721–28), but more often as the second half of a line in another metre, especially the versus reizianus (see below).

The versus reizianus (reiz) consists of an iambic quaternarius followed by a colon reizianum. But the iambic dimeter is unusual in that it usually begins with a double short syllable, which gives it a certain vigour:
| uu – x – | x – u – || x – x – – |

Another feature of the versus reizianus is that instead of a caesura after the fifth element (as is usual in an ia7), there is usually one after the fourth element.

Usually the versus reizianus is used singly or as a couplet in the midst of other metres, but there is one long stretch of 32 lines in Aulularia (415-446) entirely in this metre. In the following extract, the miserly old man Euclio has just chased the hired cook Congrio out of his house:

 

| uu –  u –  | –  uu u – || –  uu u  –  – | 
| uu –  u –  | uu –  u – || –  –  uu –  – |
| uu –  u –  | u  –  u – || –  –  u  –  – |
| uu –  – uu | –  –  u – || uu –  uu –  – |
| uu –  – –  | u  –  u – || –  –  –  uu – |
| uu uu – –  | u  –  u – || uu –  uu –  – |
| uu –  uu – | u  –  u – || –  –  u  –  – |
| uu –  u –  | –  –  u – || uu –  uu –  – |
EUC. Come back! Where are you running away to? CON. Why are you shouting, you idiot?
EUC. Because I'm going now to report your name to the magistrates! CON. What for?
EUC. Because you have a knife! CON. That's normal for a cook! EUC. Why did you threaten
me? CON. I think it's a pity I didn't go further and stab you in the ribs!
EUC. No man alive today is more criminal than you,
nor is there any that I'd rather do harm to on purpose!
CON. By Pollux, even if you were to say nothing, it's evident. The thing itself is witness!
I've been so beaten by your sticks that I'm softer than a poofter!

Wilamowitzianus
The wilamowitzianus (wil), named after the German classicist Ulrich von Wilamowitz-Moellendorf, is a short line of the following shape, ending in a choriamb (note that the two anceps syllables are never both short):
| – x x – | – u u – |
It is used in about 51 lines of Plautus and 5 of Terence, as in the following exchange from Bacchides between the two young men Pistoclerus and Mnesilochus:

| – uu u –  | – u u – |
| – uu u uu | – u u – |
| – uu – uu | – u u – |
| – uu u –  | – u u – |
| – uu u –  | – u u – |
| – uu u –  | – u u – |
| – u  – uu | – u u – |
| – uu – uu | – u u – |
PIS. Mnesilochus, what's the matter? MN. I'm done for!
PIS. May the gods make it better. MN I'm done for!
PIS. Won't you be quiet, you fool? MN. Be quiet?
PIS. You're not right in the head. MN. I'm done for!
There are so many harsh and bitter evils now arising in my heart!
That I could have trusted that accusation! I was angry with you for no reason!

Sometimes a wilamowitzianus is followed by a colon (part line) in cretic metre, as the following exchange between the fisherman Gripus and the slave Trachalio in Plautus's Rudens:

| – u – uu | – u u – || – u – | – – |
| – u – uu | – u u – || – u – | – – |

GRI. If you give a pledge to me that you will not be unfaithful.
TRA. I give you my pledge, I will be faithful, whoever you are. GRI. Listen...

Bibliography

Barsby, John (ed.) (1999). Terence: Eunuchus. Cambridge University Press.
Beare, W. (1953). "The Meaning of Ictus as applied to Latin Verse".  Hermathena, No. 81 (May 1953), pp. 29–40.
Benferhat, Yasmina (2007) Review of Kruschwitz et al, (eds) Terentius Poeta, Bryn Mawr Classical Review.
Ceccarelli, L. (1988).  Rome
Clackson, James (2012) (ed.). A Companion to the Latin Language. Wiley-Blackwell.
Danckaert, L. (2013). "Magis rythmus quam metron" (draft article for Symbolae Osloenses)
de Melo, Wolfgang D.C. (2007) Review of Cesare Questa, . Urbino 2007. Bryn Mawr Classical Review, 2007.12.21
de Melo, Wolfgang D.C. (ed.) (2011). Plautus: Amphitryon etc. Loeb Classical Library.
Exon, Charles (1906). "The Relation of the Resolved Arsis and Resolved Thesis in Plautus to the Prose Accent". The Classical Review Vol. 20, No. 1, pp. 31–36.
Fattori, Marco (2021). "What are we talking about when we talk about ‘iambic shortening’?". Linguistic Studies and Essays 59(2) 2021: 97–132.
Fontaine, M.; Scafuro, A.C. (eds.) (2014). The Oxford Handbook of Greek and Roman Comedy. OUP.
Fortson, Benjamin W. (2008). Language and Rhythm in Plautus: Synchronic and Diachronic Studies.
Fortson, Benjamin W. (2012). "Latin Prosody and Metrics". In Clackson (2012), pp. 92–104.
Gellar-Goad, T.H.M. (2014) Review of Moore (2012) Music in Roman Comedy Bryn Mawr Classical Review.
Gratwick, A.S. (1982). "The Origins of Roman Drama". Chapter 5 of E.J. Kenny (ed.) The Cambridge History of Classical Literature, vol. 2, part 1., pp. 77–137.
Gratwick, A.S. (1993). Plautus: Menaechmi. Cambridge University Press.
Gratwick, A.S. (2009). "Meyer's Law" (Review of Lucio Ceccarelli (1988)). The Classical Review.
Groton, A.H. (1995). Review of Gratwick (1993) Plautus: Menaechmi. Bryn Mawr Classical Review.
Karakasis, Evangelos (2003). "A Note on Terentian Metre". Materiali e discussioni per l'analisi dei testi classici, No. 50 (2003), pp. 169–183.
Laidlaw, W.A. (1936). "Jacobsohn's Law of Plautine Scansion". The Classical Quarterly, Vol. 30, No. 2 (Apr., 1936), pp. 33–39.
Lindsay, W.M. (1893). "The Shortening of Long Syllables in Plautus". The Journal of Philology, Vol. 22, Iss. 44,  (Jan 1, 1893): 1.
Lindsay, W.M. (1894). The Latin Language. Oxford.
Lindsay, W.M. (1900). The Captivi of Plautus.
Lindsay, W.M. (1922). Early Latin Verse. Oxford.
Moore, Timothy J. (2007). Terence as Musical Innovator in Peter Kruschwitz, Widu-Wolfgang Ehlers, Fritz Felgentreu (eds). Terentius Poeta.  
Moore, Timothy J. (2012a), Music in Roman Comedy. Cambridge University Press.  .
Moore, Timothy J. (2012b). "Don’t Skip the Meter! Introducing Students to the Music of Roman Comedy," Classical Journal 108 (2012/13) 218–234.
Mountford, J.F. (1970), article "Metre, Latin", in N.G.L. Hammond, H.H. Scullard (eds) The Oxford Classical Dictionary, 2nd edition.
Pearson, Lionel (1990). Aristoxenus: Elementa Rhythmica. (Oxford )
Questa, Cesare (2007). La Metrica di Plauto e Terenzio (2007). Urbino: Quattro Venti.
Radford, Robert S. (1926) Review of: Early Latin Verse by W. M. Lindsay. Classical Philology Vol. 21, No. 4 (Oct., 1926), pp. 367–372.
Raven, D. S. (1965). Latin Metre: An Introduction. Routledge. 
Schlicher, J. J. (1902). "Word-Accent in Early Latin Verse." The American Journal of Philology, Vol. 23, No. 1 (1902), pp. 46–67.
Sonnenschein, E.A. (1929). "Ictus and Accent in Early Latin Dramatic Verse". The Classical Quarterly, Vol. 23, No. 2 (Apr., 1929), pp. 80–86.
Stroh, Wilfried (1990). "Arsis und Thesis oder: wie hat man lateinische Verse gesprochen?" In: Michael von Albrecht, Werner Schubert (Hrsg.): Musik und Dichtung. Neue Forschungsbeiträge. Viktor Pöschl zum 80. Geburtstag gewidmet (= Quellen und Studien zur Musikgeschichte von der Antike bis in die Gegenwart 23). Lang, Frankfurt am Main u. a., pp. 87–116.
Sturtevant, E.H. (1919). "The Coincidence of Accent and Ictus in Plautus and Terence". Classical Philology, Vol. 14, No. 3 (Jul., 1919), pp. 234–244.
Sturtevant, E.H. (1929). Reviewed Work(s): Iktus und Akzent im Lateinischen Sprechvers by Eduard Fraenkel. The American Journal of Philology, Vol. 50, No. 1 (1929), pp. 95–99.
Traill, Ariana (2009). Review of Fortson (2008). Bryn Mawr Classical Review.

References

External links
Database by Timothy J. Moore of The Meters of Roman Comedy Washington University in St Louis.

 
Prosodies by language
Ancient Roman theatre